Biserka Vrbek (born 17 June 1959) is a Croatian sports shooter. She competed in the women's 50 metre rifle three positions event at the 1984 Summer Olympics.

References

1959 births
Living people
Croatian female sport shooters
Olympic shooters of Yugoslavia
Shooters at the 1984 Summer Olympics
Sportspeople from Zagreb
20th-century Croatian women